Alternative pronunciation of Cicero.
 Nom de guerre of Melbourne sports journalist Thomas Wallis Kelynack (1868–1936)